The Welsh Marches line, known historically as the North and West Route, is the railway line running from Newport in south-east Wales to Shrewsbury in the West Midlands region of England by way of Abergavenny, Hereford and Craven Arms and thence (by some definitions) to Crewe via Whitchurch. The line thus links the south of Wales to north-west England via the Welsh Marches region, bypassing Birmingham. Through services from south-west Wales, Swansea and Cardiff to Manchester (hourly in each direction) and from Cardiff to Wrexham, Chester, the north coast of Wales and Anglesey (every two hours in each direction) constitute the bulk of passenger operations on the route.

History

The line that exists today is the amalgamation of two lines, both with influence from the LNWR. The southern section from Newport to Hereford is formed from the Newport, Abergavenny and Hereford Railway, while the northern section from Hereford to Shrewsbury is formed from the joint GWR/LNWR Shrewsbury and Hereford Railway. From Shrewsbury north to Crewe, the line runs over the LNWR-owned Crewe and Shrewsbury Railway.

When the two railways arrived in the important market town of Hereford, the LNWR had already built Hereford Barton. The S&HR and the GWR agreed to build the Hereford Barrs Court, which was then also used by the Midland Railway's Hereford, Hay and Brecon Railway. After Hereford Council put pressure on the LNWR, they closed Hereford Barton to passengers, using it as a joint goods depot.

Under the 1960s Beeching Axe, many of the supporting branch lines were closed and the Hereford Barton loop closed. The remaining Hereford station was renamed Hereford Station and retains its Victorian Gothic architecture.

Route
The cities, towns and villages served by the routes are listed below from south to north:
 Newport
 connections with the South Wales Main Line and line to Gloucester
 Cwmbran
 Pontypool and New Inn
 Abergavenny
 Hereford
 connection with Cotswold Line to Worcester
 Leominster
 Ludlow
 Craven Arms
 connection with the Heart of Wales line to Llanelli
 Church Stretton
 Shrewsbury
 connection with Cambrian Line to Aberystwyth and Pwllheli, and the line to Wolverhampton.
 through services via the Shrewsbury–Chester line to Wrexham for trains to London Euston and Liverpool via Bidston, Chester then to Holyhead or Manchester Piccadilly.
 Yorton
 Wem
 Prees
 Whitchurch
 Wrenbury
 Nantwich
 Crewe
 connection with West Coast Main Line, and North Wales Coast Line to Holyhead (for ferries to Dublin)
 through services to Manchester Piccadilly

Services
Transport for Wales Rail operates all passenger services on the line.

The line is very popular for railtours.

Great Western Railway 
While the Marches line does not form any Great Western Railway passenger services, the operator moves its Class 800 (formerly HST) empty rolling stock 05:50 and 06:33 in the morning, and 22:10 and 23:38 at night along the Hereford to Newport section of the line, where stock returns to the Bristol Parkway Stoke Gifford IET Depot.

First Great Western formerly operated a limited service to Abergavenny as an extension of the service from London Paddington to Hereford, but this was withdrawn after just one year due to low usage.

See also
 Flounders' Folly

References

Sources

Further reading

Gallery

Railway lines in Wales
Railway lines in the West Midlands (region)
Rail transport in Herefordshire
Rail transport in Monmouthshire
Rail transport in Shropshire
Rail transport in Cheshire
Rail transport in Newport, Wales
Rail transport in Torfaen
Railway lines in North West England
England–Wales border
Standard gauge railways in Wales
Standard gauge railways in England